The 2020 Championship League (also known as the BetVictor Championship League Snooker 2020) was a professional ranking snooker tournament that took place from 13 September to 30 October 2020 in the Ballroom, Stadium MK in Milton Keynes, England. The event featured 117 players from the World Snooker Tour as well as ten players from the 2020 Q School Order of Merit. It featured three rounds of round-robin groups of four, before a best-of-five final. It was the 15th edition of the Championship League, and it was a ranking tournament for the first time.

Ryan Day made his second career maximum break in the final frame of his match against Rod Lawler, and John Higgins made his 11th career maximum in the final frame of his match against Kyren Wilson.

Kyren Wilson won the tournament with a 3–1 final victory over Judd Trump. This was Wilson's fourth ranking title. He ended Trump's 10-final winning streak.

Tournament format
There were 127 players taking part in the event. The competition began with 32 rounds of group matches with each group consisting of four players. Two groups were played to a finish every day during two blocks of eight days, from 13 to 20 September and from 28 September to 5 October, using a two-table setup in the arena. The groups were contested using a round-robin format, with six matches played in each group. All matches in group play were played as best-of-four frames, with three points awarded for a win and one point for a draw. Group positions were determined by points scored, frame difference and then head-to-head results between players who were tied. Places that were still tied were then determined by the highest  made in the group.

The 32 players that topped the group tables qualified for the group winners' stage, consisting of eight groups of four players. The eight winners from the group winners' stage qualified for the two final groups before the final took place later on the same day. The winner took the Championship League title and a place at the 2020 Champion of Champions.

Prize fund 
The breakdown of prize money for the tournament is shown below.

Stage One
Winner: £3,000
Runner-up: £2,000
Third place: £1,000
Fourth place: £0

Stage Two
Winner: £4,000
Runner-up: £3,000
Third place: £2,000
Fourth place: £1,000

Stage Three
Winner: £6,000
Runner-up: £4,000
Third place: £2,000
Fourth place: £1,000

Final
Winner: £20,000
Runner-up: £10,000

Tournament total: £328,000

Main draw

Stage One
Stage One consisted of 32 groups, each containing four players.

Group 1
Group 1 was played on 13 September.

Group 2
Group 2 was played on 13 September.

Group 3
Group 3 was played on 14 September.

Group 4
Group 4 was played on 14 September.

Group 5
Group 5 was played on 15 September.

Group 6
Group 6 was played on 15 September.

Group 7
Group 7 was played on 16 September.

Group 8
Group 8 was played on 16 September.

Group 9
Group 9 was played on 29 September.

Group 10
Group 10 was played on 17 September.

Group 11
Group 11 was played on 28 September.

Group 12
Group 12 was played on 18 September.

Group 13
Group 13 was played on 19 September.

Group 14
Group 14 was played on 19 September.

Group 15
Group 15 was played on 20 September.

Anthony Hamilton was originally due to take part in this group, but withdrew and was replaced by Daniel Womersley.

Group 16
Group 16 was played on 20 September.

Group 17
Group 17 was played on 28 September.

Group 18
Group 18 was played on 18 September.

Group 19
Group 19 was played on 29 September.

Group 20
Group 20 was played on 4 October.

Group 21
Group 21 was played on 17 September.

Group 22
Group 22 was played on 30 September.

Group 23
Group 23 was played on 30 September.

Group 24
Group 24 was played on 3 October.

Daniel Wells was withdrawn from the group after a positive COVID-19 test.

Group 25
Group 25 was played on 1 October.

Group 26
Group 26 was played on 1 October.

Group 27
Group 27 was played on 2 October.

Group 28
Group 28 was played on 2 October.

Mark Williams was to take part in this group, but withdrew and was replaced by Haydon Pinhey.

Lei Peifan was withdrawn from the group after an invalid COVID-19 test.

Group 29
Group 29 was played on 4 October.

Group 30
Group 30 was played on 3 October.

Group 31
Group 31 was played on 5 October.

Group 32
Group 32 was played on 5 October.

Ronnie O'Sullivan was originally due to take part in this group, but withdrew and was replaced by John Astley.}}

Stage Two
Stage Two consisted of eight groups, each containing four players.

Group A
Group A was played on 26 October.

Group B
Group B was played on 27 October.

Group C
Group C was played on 26 October.

Group D
Group D was played on 27 October.

Group E
Group E was played on 28 October.

Group F
Group F was played on 28 October.

Group G
Group G was played on 29 October.

Group H
Group H was played on 29 October.

Stage Three
Stage Three consisted of two groups, each containing four players.

Group 1
Group 1 was played on 30 October.

Group 2
Group 2 was played on 30 October.

Key:P=Matchesplayed; W=Matcheswon; D=Matchesdrawn; L=Matcheslost; FW=Frameswon; FL=Frameslost; FD=Framedifference; HB=Highestbreak

Final

Century breaks

A total of 90 century breaks were made during the tournament.

147, 126, 123, 107  John Higgins
147, 100, 100  Ryan Day
145, 143, 133, 116, 101  Barry Hawkins
140  Matthew Stevens
139, 122, 109  Ken Doherty
139, 103, 100  Graeme Dott
139  Jack Lisowski
138, 112, 109, 102  Joe Perry
135, 108  Thepchaiya Un-Nooh
134, 134, 122, 119, 114, 109, 102, 100  Zhou Yuelong
134, 128, 118, 118, 109  Mark Selby
133  Oliver Lines
132  Gerard Greene
130, 112  Jamie Clarke
130  Michael White
129, 127  Stuart Bingham
128, 111  Luo Honghao
128  Martin O'Donnell
126, 120  Chang Bingyu
125, 124, 100  Neil Robertson
125, 110, 104, 103, 100  Kyren Wilson
125  David Gilbert
125  Hossein Vafaei
124, 118, 110  Judd Trump
123  Tom Ford
122, 109  Tian Pengfei
121, 100  Mark Davis
121  Brandon Sargeant
121  Xu Si
117  Zhao Xintong
116, 102  David Grace
114, 107  Gao Yang
114  Ian Burns
112  Robbie Williams
111, 102  Shaun Murphy
108  Matthew Selt
107  Scott Donaldson
107  Joe O'Connor
106  Mark Allen
105, 102  Liang Wenbo
105  Xiao Guodong
104  Martin Gould
103  Jamie Jones
102  Lyu Haotian
100  Michael Holt

References

External links
 Matchroom Sport – Championship League Snooker
 World Snooker Tour – Calendar 2020/2021 

2020 (2)
2020 in snooker
2020 in English sport
September 2020 sports events in the United Kingdom
October 2020 sports events in the United Kingdom
2020 Championship League
European Series